The 1955 Davidson Wildcats football team was an American football team that represented Davidson College as a member of the Southern Conference (SoCon) during the 1955 college football season. Led by fourth-year head coach Bill Dole, the Wildcats compiled an overall record of 5–4 with a mark of 3–2 in conference play, tying for third place in the SoCon.

Schedule

References

Davidson
Davidson Wildcats football seasons
Davidson Wildcats football